Thomas Chase (died 1449) was a 15th-century judge and cleric who was Chancellor of the University of Oxford, and subsequently held the office of Lord Chancellor of Ireland.

Chase was Warden of the Hospital of St Bartholomew near Rye in 1420 and was subsequently attached to the free chapel at Jesmond near Newcastle. In politics, he was a supporter of Humprey, the "Good Duke of Gloucester", and served as one of his chaplains. He was Chancellor of the University of Oxford from 1426 until 1431, and Lord Chancellor of Ireland from 1441 until 1446.

The Crown had originally appointed him as Irish Chancellor in 1432, and he travelled to Ireland to take up office, but Richard Talbot, Archbishop of Dublin, the outgoing Chancellor, refused to hand over the seal of office. Chase, perhaps intimidated by the Archbishop's formidable personality, seems to have meekly returned to England, until such time as Archbishop Talbot was willing to surrender his office, as he duly did in 1441. Due to the more than usually turbulent political conditions in Ireland, which was wracked by the feud between the Butler and Talbot factions, Chase when he eventually took up office was urged not to leave the country unless strictly necessary and, if he must travel abroad to hurry back as soon as possible. He did visit England from time to time, and it was on one such visit that he presented the petition referred to below.

Although he was described as a man of great learning,  Chase, unlike most holders of high office at the time, never became a bishop, and spent his last years as parson of High Ongar in Essex, where he died in 1449.

As Lord Chancellor he is mainly remembered for his petition to the Privy Council that Irish law students seeking admission to the Inns of Court in London should receive equal treatment with their English colleagues, to which the Council returned "a  full and effectual response under the Privy Seal of England".

  St Mary, High Ongar- Chace spent his later years as vicar here.

References 

Year of birth unknown
1449 deaths
Chancellors of the University of Oxford
Lord chancellors of Ireland